The Second Coming is the second album by R&B singer TQ. It was released in 2000 in the United Kingdom; plans for a United States release were cancelled.

Mistakes appear across various releases: the song "One Day" is listed as featuring Bone Thugs-n-Harmony member Layzie Bone—whose name is incorrectly spelled "Lazy Bone"—in the Europe-only official releases; however, the track in question actually features West Coast rapper E-40. Ironically, the never-released American version did indeed feature Layzie Bone.

The album peaked at No. 32 on the UK Albums Chart.

Critical reception
The Birmingham Evening Mail called the single "Daily" "witty," and asked "Who says today's soul can't be commercial and fun?"

Track listings

UK/Europe track listing

Germany and Netherlands track listing

Unreleased USA Track listing

References

2000 albums
TQ (singer) albums
Albums produced by Warren G